USS Lake Tulare (ID-2652) was a cargo ship of the United States Navy that served during World War I and its immediate aftermath.

Construction and acquisition

Lake Tulare was laid down under a United States Shipping Board (USSB) contract as the commercial cargo ship SS War Valour in 1917 by the Superior Shipbuilding Company in Superior, Wisconsin as hull number 530. Her name was changed to SS Lake Tulare while she was under construction, and she was launched on 15 December 1917 and completed in April 1918.

On registration the  ship was given official number 216066 and signal letters LJTD. Lake Tulare was  length overall,  length between perpendiculars,  breadth,  mean draft, depth of hold  and registry crew number of 28. Ownership remained with USSB during subsequent military service until sold in 1919.

After her completion in 1918, the United States Army acquired her for use as a cargo ship.

U.S. Navy career
The U.S. Navy acquired Lake Tulare from the Army for use during World War I and assigned her the naval registry identification number 2652. Lake Tulare was delivered to the Navy and commissioned as USS Lake Tulare (ID-2652) at Cardiff, Wales on 19 October 1918.

The ship, armed with one 3-inch, 50 cal gun, was assigned to the Naval Overseas Transportation Service (NOTS) for use as a coal transport between ports in the United Kingdom and France. Operating out of Cardiff, a major coal port, she performed these duties through the end of the war in November 1918 and into 1919.

Transferred to the United States Food Administration on 1 March 1919, Lake Tulare carried food from British and French ports to Rotterdam in the Netherlands and Danzig, Germany, until 14 July 1919, when the Food Administration returned her to the Navy and she resumed military cargo runs.

Decommissioning and disposal
After steaming to New York City in the late summer of 1919, Lake Tulare was decommissioned on 15 September 1919 and was returned to the U.S. Shipping Board the same day.

Later career
The Shipping Board sold Lake Tulare to the International Coal Transportation Company of New York City in 1919 which owned the ship into 1923. That year the ship was sold to K. Th. Einersen of Kristiana, Norway. In 1924, she was sold to Skibs. A/S Manitowoc, also of Kristiana, and renamed Bestik. In 1931, Bestik was sold to the China Merchants Navigation Company of Shanghai, China, and renamed Hai Hsiang. Hai Hsiang was sold again in 1938, to William Hunt and Company, Ltd., of Shanghai.

On 8 December 1941, Japanese aircraft bombed and sank Hai Hsiang at Szechuen, China. Her wreck was raised in 1946 and scrapped.

Footnotes

References

External links
 NavSource Online: Section Patrol Craft Photo Archive: Lake Tulare (ID 2652)

1917 ships
Ships built in Superior, Wisconsin
Cargo ships of the United States Navy
World War I cargo ships of the United States
Design 1020 ships